Leonard Cockayne  (7 April 1855 – 8 July 1934) is regarded as New Zealand's greatest botanist and a founder of modern science in New Zealand.

Biography
He was born in Sheffield, England where he attended Wesley College.  He travelled to Australia in 1877 and shortly moved on to New Zealand where he became established as a botanist.

In June 1901, he attended the first conference of horticulturists in New Zealand at Dunedin where he presented a paper on the plants of the Chatham Islands and advocated the establishment of experimental plant research stations in New Zealand. This helped to establish Cockayne's reputation.

Cockayne was a member of the 1907 Sub-Antarctic Islands Scientific Expedition. The main aim of the expedition was to extend the magnetic survey of New Zealand by investigating Auckland and Campbell Islands but botanical, biological and zoological surveys were also conducted. The voyage also resulted in rescue of the castaways of the shipwreck the Dundonald in the Auckland Islands.

Cockayne's major contributions to botany were in plant ecology and in his theories of hybridisation. In 1899 he published the first New Zealand account of successional changes in vegetation. Between 1897 and 1930 he published 49 papers in the Transactions and Proceedings of the Royal Society of New Zealand.

He was elected Fellow of the Royal Society in 1912 on the proposal of Sir J. D. Hooker and was awarded the Hector Memorial Medal in that same year. In 1914 he was awarded the Hutton Memorial Medal and in 1932 the Veitch Memorial Medal of the Royal Horticultural Society.

Cockayne corresponded frequently with famous botanists all over the world. This helped facilitate the publication of New Zealand papers in overseas journals. He was also instrumental in bringing visitors to New Zealand. Johannes Paulus Lotsy, the Dutch botanist, lectured on the place of hybrids in evolution. The Swedish couple Einar and Greta Du Rietz stayed six months in the summer of 1926–27 collecting from the Far North to the subantarctic islands, paying special attention to lichens. The director of Kew Gardens, Sir Arthur Hill, came in 1928.

Cockayne also assisted and encouraged fellow botanists in their work. He was thanked by co-authors Robert Malcolm Laing and Ellen Wright Blackwell in the preface of their classic book of New Zealand biology Plants of New Zealand for "helping us over many slippery places and for much generous assistance freely given”. He encouraged Charles Ethelbert Foweraker, later senior lecturer in botany, and sometime lecturer in charge of the Forestry School, at the University of Canterbury, in his career, the two men having first corresponded in 1911 when Cockayne was writing The Vegetation of New Zealand; the two went together on many expeditions in Marlborough and Canterbury.

In the 1929 King's Birthday Honours, Cockayne was appointed a Companion of the Order of St Michael and St George, for honorary scientific services to the New Zealand government.

The Cockayne Reserve in Christchurch, Cockayne Memorial Garden at Christchurch Botanic Gardens, the Cockayne Nature Walk near Otira on the West Coast, and the Cockayne Lookout in Otari-Wilton's Bush (Wellington) dedicated solely to New Zealand native plants, are all named after him. His son Alfred Cockayne also became a noted botanist.

Bibliography
New Zealand Plants and Their Story 1910
Observations Concerning Evolution, Derived from Ecological Studies in New Zealand
Vegetation of New Zealand
The Cultivation of New Zealand Plants 1923
Trees of New Zealand (with E. Phillips Turner)
Report on the dune-areas of New Zealand: their geology, botany and reclamation.
Report on a botanical survey of Stewart Island

References

External links

the 1966 Encyclopaedia of New Zealand
Leonard Cockayne: Horticulturist
Biography in Botanical Discovery in New Zealand: The Resident Botanists by W. R. B. Oliver 

1855 births
1934 deaths
English emigrants to New Zealand
20th-century New Zealand botanists
Scientists from Sheffield
Veitch Memorial Medal recipients
New Zealand Fellows of the Royal Society
People educated at Wesley College, Sheffield
New Zealand horticulturists
New Zealand conservationists
19th-century New Zealand botanists
Presidents of the Royal Society of New Zealand
New Zealand Companions of the Order of St Michael and St George